Chereshovo is a village in the municipality of Belitsa, in Blagoevgrad Province, Bulgaria. It is located approximately 27 km west of Belitsa and 88 kilometers southeast of Sofia. A fourth class municipal road connects the village with the secondary national road Razlog - Velingrad via the villages of Kraishte, Lyutovo, and Babyak. As of 2010, it had a population of 270 people all of them Muslim of Pomak origin. Aerial electrical supply and drinking water from local sources are provided. The village has no elected mayor, having fewer than 350 inhabitants, and a suffragan mayor, appointed from the municipal council is in charge.

References

Villages in Blagoevgrad Province